Mike Vermeille (born April 5, 1992) is a Swiss ice hockey defenceman. He is currently playing with HC Sion-Nendaz 4 Vallées of the Swiss MySports League. Vermeille made his European Elite debut during the 2010–11 season playing in the National League A with the Genève-Servette HC.

Vermeille participated at the 2012 World Junior Ice Hockey Championships as a member of the Switzerland men's national junior ice hockey team.

References

1992 births
Living people
Genève-Servette HC players
HC Red Ice players
Swiss ice hockey defencemen